Berkeley County Airport  is a county-owned public-use airport in Berkeley County, South Carolina, United States. It is located one nautical mile (1.85 km) southwest of the central business district of Moncks Corner, South Carolina.

Although many U.S. airports use the same three-letter location identifier for the FAA and IATA, this facility is assigned MKS by the FAA but has no designation from the IATA (which assigned MKS to Mekane Selam Airport in Ethiopia).

Facilities and aircraft 
The Berkeley County government took over the FBO at the airport on July 1, 1999. It has one runway designated 5/23 with an asphalt surface measuring 5,001 by 75 feet (1,326 x 23 m).

For the 12-month period ending November 15, 2019, the airport had 8,100 aircraft operations, an average of 22 per day: 92% general aviation, 7% air taxi, and 1% military. At that time there were 33 aircraft based at this airport: 88% single-engine, 9% multi-engine, and 3% jet.

References

External links 
 Airport page at Berkeley County website
 Berkeley County Airport (MKS) information from SC Division of Aeronautics
 Aerial image as of 14 February 1994 from USGS The National Map
 

Airports in South Carolina
Buildings and structures in Berkeley County, South Carolina
Transportation in Berkeley County, South Carolina